The 2009–10 Polski Liga Hokejovwa season was the twelfth season of the Polska Liga Hokejowa and the 54th season of a Polish championship. Ten teams played 48 games with Podhale Nowy Targ defeated KS Cracovia in the final to win their 19th national championship.

Regular season

Final round

Qualification round

Playoffs

Statistical leaders

Scoring leaders 
GP = Games played; G = Goals; A = Assists; Pts = Points;; PIM = Penalty minutes

Leading goaltenders 
GP = Games played; TOI = Time on ice (minutes); W = Wins; L = Losses; OT = Overtime/shootout losses; GA = Goals against; SO = Shutouts; Sv% = Save percentage; GAA = Goals against average

References
Season on hockeyarchives.info

External links
 

2009-10 Polska Liga Hokejowa season
Pol
Polska